Bishop Peak may refer to:

 Bishop Peak (Antarctica)
 Bishop Peak (California)

See also 
 Mount Bishop (disambiguation)